National Highway 727AA, commonly referred to as NH 727AA is a national highway in India. It is a secondary route of National Highway 27.  NH-727AA runs in the states of Bihar and Uttar Pradesh in India.

Route 
NH727AA connects Manuapul (Bettiah), Patzirwa, Paknaha, Pipraghat and Sevrahi in the states of Bihar and Uttar Pradesh.

Junctions  
 
  Terminal near Manuapul (Bettiah).
  Terminal near Sevrahi.

See also 
 List of National Highways in India
 List of National Highways in India by state

References

External links 

 NH 727AA on OpenStreetMap

National highways in India
National Highways in Bihar
National Highways in Uttar Pradesh